Statistics in Medicine is a peer-reviewed statistics journal published by Wiley.
Established in 1982, the journal publishes articles on medical statistics.
The journal is indexed by Mathematical Reviews and SCOPUS.
According to the Journal Citation Reports, the journal has a 2021 impact factor of 2.497.

References

External links 

Mathematics journals
Publications established in 1982
English-language journals
Wiley (publisher) academic journals